Novoyantuzovo (Yañı Yandıź) is a rural locality (a selo) in Verkhnelachentausky Selsoviet, Birsky District, Bashkortostan, Russia. The population was 286 as of 2010. There are 6 streets.

Geography 
Novoyantuzovo is located 40 km northwest of Birsk (the district's administrative centre) by road. Yeldyak is the nearest rural locality.

References 

Rural localities in Birsky District